HZS may refer to:

 Antwerp Maritime Academy
 Henry Z. Steinway (1915–2008), American piano maker
 Honolulu Zoo Society
 Ice Hockey Federation of Slovenia
 Mountain Rescue Service (Slovakia)
 Hangzhou Spark Team in the Overwatch League